Cecil H. Underwood Wildlife Management Area is located on  near in Marshall and Wetzel counties near Cameron, West Virginia.  The rugged, steep terrain varies in elevation from about 800 feet along the banks of the West Virginia Fork of Fish Creek to over 1500 feet.  The steep slopes are covered with mixed hardwoods and forest clearings fields. The WMA is located about 10 miles south of Cameron on Rice Ridge Road off U. S. Route 250, along the border of Marshall and Wetzel counties.

Hunting and Fishing
Hunting opportunities, limited by the small size of the area, include deer, grouse, squirrel, turkey and grouse. Fishing opportunities in the West Virginia Fork of Fish Creek include smallmouth bass, rock bass, and sunfish.  Camping is prohibited at this WMA.

See also
Animal conservation
Hunting
List of West Virginia wildlife management areas
Recreational fishing

References

External links
 West Virginia DNR District 1 Wildlife Management Areas
West Virginia Hunting Regulations
West Virginia Fishing Regulations

Wildlife management areas of West Virginia
Protected areas of Marshall County, West Virginia
Protected areas of Wetzel County, West Virginia
IUCN Category V